Miska Magyarics, official name Mihály Magyarics, (31 January 1825 – 8 January 1883) was a Hungarian Slovene poet.

Magyarics was born in Mali Dolenci in the Kingdom of Hungary (now Dolenci, Slovenia). His parents were Jakab Magyarics, a Roman Catholic peasant, and Anna Messics. In the second half of the 19th century by right of the tradition of his village, Magyarics wrote a Catholic hymnal in Prekmurje Slovene (279 pages and 115 hymns).

He died in Mali Dolenci and was buried at Dolenci Cemetery near St. Nicholas's Church on 10 January 1883.

See also 
 List of Slovene writers and poets in Hungary

Literature 
 Ivan Škafar: Bibliografija prekmurskih tiskov od 1715 do 1919, Ljubljana 1978.

1825 births
1883 deaths
People from the Municipality of Šalovci
Slovenian writers and poets in Hungary
Slovenian poets
Slovenian male poets
19th-century poets